Heliocheilus mesoleuca is a moth in the family Noctuidae first described by Oswald Bertram Lower in 1902. It is found in Australia in New South Wales, the Northern Territory, Queensland and South Australia.

External links

Australian Faunal Directory

Heliocheilus
Moths of Australia